Gaston Houngbédji (born 5 February 1998) is a Beninese football defender for ASPAC FC .

References

1996 births
Living people
Beninese footballers
Benin international footballers
ASPAC FC players
Association football defenders